The Loire 60 was a 1930s French prototype for a long-range maritime reconnaissance flying boat produced by Loire Aviation.

It was a trimotor training seaplane for reconnaissance, derived from the Loire 50. A single prototype was built and tested, but it never entered production.

Specifications

External links

060
Loire 060
Flying boats
Three-engined pusher aircraft
Parasol-wing aircraft
Aircraft first flown in 1932